Melocactus lanssensianus is a species of plant in the family Cactaceae. It is endemic to Brazil.  Its natural habitats are rocky areas and hot deserts. It is threatened by habitat loss.

References

Flora of Brazil
lanssensianus
Data deficient plants
Taxonomy articles created by Polbot